In category theory, a branch of mathematics, a Krull–Schmidt category is a generalization of categories in which the Krull–Schmidt theorem holds. They arise, for example, in the study of finite-dimensional modules over an algebra.

Definition 

Let C be an additive category, or more generally an additive -linear category for a commutative ring . We call C a Krull–Schmidt category provided that every object decomposes into a finite direct sum of objects having local endomorphism rings. Equivalently, C has split idempotents and the endomorphism ring of every object is semiperfect.

Properties 

One has the analogue of the Krull–Schmidt theorem in Krull–Schmidt categories:

An object is called indecomposable if it is not isomorphic to a direct sum of two nonzero objects. In a Krull–Schmidt category we have that
an object is indecomposable if and only if its endomorphism ring is local.
every object is isomorphic to a finite direct sum of indecomposable objects.

One can define the Auslander–Reiten quiver of a Krull–Schmidt category.

Examples 

 An abelian category in which every object has finite length. This includes as a special case the category of finite-dimensional modules over an algebra.
 The category of finitely-generated modules over a finite -algebra, where  is a commutative Noetherian complete local ring.
 The category of coherent sheaves on a complete variety over an algebraically-closed field.

A non-example 

The category of finitely-generated projective modules over the integers has split idempotents, and every module is isomorphic to a finite direct sum of copies of the regular module, the number being given by the rank. Thus the category has unique decomposition into indecomposables, but is not Krull-Schmidt since the regular module does not have a local endomorphism ring.

See also 

 Quiver
 Karoubi envelope

Notes

References 

 Michael Atiyah (1956) On the Krull-Schmidt theorem with application to sheaves Bull. Soc. Math. France 84, 307–317.
 Henning Krause, Krull-Remak-Schmidt categories and projective covers, May 2012.
 Irving Reiner (2003) Maximal orders. Corrected reprint of the 1975 original. With a foreword by M. J. Taylor. London Mathematical Society Monographs. New Series, 28. The Clarendon Press, Oxford University Press, Oxford. .
 Claus Michael Ringel (1984) Tame Algebras and Integral Quadratic Forms, Lecture Notes in Mathematics 1099, Springer-Verlag, 1984.

Category theory
Representation theory